Caught in the Crossfire is 2010 American crime drama film directed by Brian A Miller. It stars Adam Rodríguez, 50 Cent, and Richard T. Jones. The film was released direct-to-DVD on July 20, 2010.

Plot 

Two detectives caught in a crossfire between dirty cops and gangland members.

Cast 
 Adam Rodríguez as Shepherd
 50 Cent as Tino
 Richard T. Jones as Captain Emmett
 Michael Matthias as Lieutenant Michaels
 Lyle Kanouse as Detective Evans
 R.D. Miller Jr. as Benton
 Brian A Miller as A.D.A. Kevin Andrews
 Sydney Hall as Michael Pips
 Tim Fields as Lerner
 Roy Oraschin as Johnson
 Alyssa Julya Smith as Sarah Jackson
 Kurt Race as Andre Cruz
 Chris Klein as Briggs
 Christine Lakin as Tracy

References

External links 
 
 

2010 films
2010 direct-to-video films
American direct-to-video films
2010 crime drama films
American crime drama films
2010s English-language films
Films directed by Brian A. Miller
2010s American films